Þorgerður Anna Atladóttir (born 2 June 1992) is an Icelandic former team handball player. She played for the Icelandic national team, and participated at the 2011 World Women's Handball Championship in Brazil. On 28 August 2018, she announced her retirement from handball due to injuries.

References

External links

1992 births
Living people
Thorgerdur Anna Atladottir
Thorgerdur Anna Atladottir